Sherwood "Shakey" Johnson (September 2, 1925October 31, 1998) was an American jazz patron and the founder in 1954 of Shakey's Pizza, which hosted live jazz-oriented music nightly.

Early history
He was born in Sacramento, California, US, the son of a California deputy attorney general, and a graduate of Christian Brothers High School (Sacramento, California). In 1943, after graduating, Johnson joined the U.S. Navy and served two years in the Pacific theater aboard the USS Alnitah (AK-127). It was in the Navy that he got the nickname "Shakey." Johnson attended Sacramento City College, where he was known for a comedy act he performed with a fellow student. He also attended Hastings School of Law in San Francisco. In 1950, Johnson married Mary Jane Williams, whom he met at the American Legion Hall.

Pizza business
In 1954, Johnson founded Shakey's Pizza with "Big Ed" Plummer. Johnson was responsible for every detail in the original Shakey's experience, including the food, drink, the clever signs on the walls and tabletops, and especially the music. Johnson hosted live music nightly at the original parlor and insisted that it be jazz-oriented, perhaps Dixieland or ragtime, or old-time. He was named "Emperor of Jazz" at the first Jazz Jubilee in Sacramento.

Johnson contracted polio around 1960 from a polio inoculation and walked with a slight limp from then on.

Post business interests
Johnson sold out his interest in Shakey's Pizza to Colorado Milling and Elevator Co. in 1966 for $3 million. He retired to a ranch house he built on a  estate in Oregon House, California and continued to be a patron of jazz and Dixieland music. He was inducted into the Banjo Hall of Fame in Guthrie, Oklahoma, for his use of banjo music in his pizza parlors.

Johnson died of a heart attack on October 31, 1998, at the age of 73.

See also
 Banjo Hall of Fame Members

References

Obituary of Sherwood "Shakey" Johnson
Wilson, Burt. Shakey & Me. Sacramento, CA: Paloria Press, 2001.  

1925 births
1998 deaths
Jazz banjoists
Businesspeople from Sacramento, California
Pizza chain founders
Sacramento City College alumni
University of California, Hastings College of the Law alumni
American food company founders
20th-century American businesspeople
United States Navy personnel of World War II